Sphingobacterium thermophilum is a Gram-negative and strictly aerobic bacterium from the genus of Sphingobacterium which has been isolated from compost.

References

External links
Type strain of Sphingobacterium thermophilum at BacDive -  the Bacterial Diversity Metadatabase

Sphingobacteriia
Bacteria described in 2013